Odd Arne Tjersland (born 1947) is a Norwegian psychologist. He is a Professor of Clinical Psychology at the University of Oslo and a Research Professor at the Norwegian Centre for Violence and Traumatic Stress Studies. He is an expert on psychological treatment of children, youth and families, and has published many books and articles on child abuse and violence in close relationships.

He graduated with the cand.psychol. degree at the University of Oslo in 1974, became a specialist in child psychology in 1986 and in clinical family psychology in 1995, and received the dr.philos. degree in psychology in 1993. He became associate professor of psychology at the University of Oslo in 1996 and full professor in clinical psychology in 2002.

Books
Allianser. Verdier, teorier og metoder i sosialt arbeid. Gyldendal Akademisk, 2010. .
Våge å leve. En lærebok om alternative veier i behandling basert på erfaringene fra Tyrili. Tano-Aschehoug, 1998. .
Samlivsbrudd og foreldreskap. Meklingsprosessens psykologi. Universitetsforlaget, 1992. .
Atferdsterapi i Norge. Pax Forlag, 1980. .
Atferdsterapi - dressur eller hjelp til selvhjelp. Konsultasjonserfaringer fra familier. Universitetsforlaget, 1977. .

References

External links

Norwegian psychologists
University of Oslo alumni
Academic staff of the University of Oslo
Norwegian Centre for Violence and Traumatic Stress Studies people
Living people
1947 births